Palusita is a genus of moths belonging to the family Tortricidae.

Species
Palusita ochrans Razowski & Becker, 2000
Palusita paulista Razowski & Becker, 2000

See also
List of Tortricidae genera

References

 , 2005: World catalogue of insects volume 5 Tortricidae.
  2000: Boll. Zool. agr. Bachic. (2) 32: 107.

External links
tortricidae.com

Euliini
Tortricidae genera